The Neyva is a river in the Sverdlovsk Oblast of Russia, which flows out of Lake Tavatuy along the slopes of the Ural Mountains through the urban-type settlement Verkh-Neyvinsky and the towns of Nevyansk and Alapaevsk. The upper reaches are punctuated by a series of lakes and reservoirs that cover . At its confluence with the Rezh, the Nitsa (a tributary of the Tura) is formed.

References 

Rivers of Sverdlovsk Oblast